David Hardy (1877-1951) was an English cricketer active from 1904 to 1924 who played for Northamptonshire (Northants). He was born in Northampton on August 2, 1877 and died there on January 22, 1951. He appeared in 37 first-class matches as a righthanded batsman who bowled right arm medium pace. He scored over 499 runs with his highest score of 37 and took fourteen wickets with a best performance of six for 11.

Notes

1877 births
1951 deaths
English cricketers
Northamptonshire cricketers